Pier Duilio Puccetti (born 31 July 1955) is an Italian sprint canoer who competed in the late 1970s. At the 1976 Summer Olympics in Montreal, he was eliminated in the semifinals of the K-2 500 m event and the repechages of the K-4 1000 m event.

References
Sports-reference.com profile

1955 births
Canoeists at the 1976 Summer Olympics
Italian male canoeists
Living people
Olympic canoeists of Italy
20th-century Italian people